Samuel Eboule Bille (born January 16, 1982) is a Cameroonian football player.

Playing career
Bille captained South African National First Division side FC Cape Town during the 2010 season. He helped lead the club into the 1/8-finals of the 2010 Nedbank Cup, scoring a goal in the team's victory over Kaizer Chiefs.   He's got preselected 2 times in Cameroon's National Team in 2000 and 2001

Club career
 1998-2004	→ Sable, Batie, Cameroon		
 2004-2006	→ Impot, Yaounde, Cameroon		
 2006-2007	→ Witbank Spurs, South Africa	
 2007-2008	→ Mpumalanga Black Aces, South Africa	
 2008-2011	→ FC Cape Town, South Africa
 2011-2013     → Rajchanavy FC, Thailand

Award career
 1998-1999 Champion of Cameroon League 98/99 sable of batie
 2000 Winner of the super cup Roger Milla 2000 sable of batie
 2008 Finalist of the nedbank cup Mpumalanga black aces
 2010 Quarter final of the nedbank cup fc cape town

References

1982 births
Living people
Cameroonian footballers
Mpumalanga Black Aces F.C. players
F.C. Cape Town players
Expatriate footballers in Thailand
Association football central defenders